Arabaux is a commune in the Ariège department in the Occitanie region of southwestern France.

The inhabitants of the commune are known as Arabausois or Arabausoises

Geography
Arabaux is some 20 km south of Pamiers and 2 km north-east of Foix to which urban area it belongs. National Highway N20 passes through the south-western corner of the commune partly in a tunnel but it has no exit in the commune with the nearest exit No. 10 south of Saint-Jean-de-Verges. The D1 road goes from Foix through the south of the commune and continues east to Carla-de-Roquefort. Access to the village is by country roads - one from the NR20 Exit 10 and one from the D1 on the eastern border. The commune is heavily forested in the centre and west with the rest of the land farmland.

The Alses river passes through the centre of the commune from east to west then turns north forming part of the western border to join the Ariège near the NR20 Exit 10. The Ruisseau d'Araboux rises west of the village and flows north-west to join the Ariege.

Neighbouring communes and villages

History 
Bernard de Lordat, co-lord of Lordat, received Arabaux in around 1250, after an exchange with the count of Foix and thus became the lord.

Administration

List of Successive Mayors

Demography
In 2017 the commune had 76 inhabitants.

See also
Communes of the Ariège department

External links
Arabaux on the National Geographic Institute website 
Arabaux on Géoportail, National Geographic Institute (IGN) website 
Arabaux on the 1750 Cassini Map

References

Communes of Ariège (department)